Isotta Fraschini was an Italian luxury car manufacturer, also producing trucks, as well as engines for marine and aviation use. Founded in Milan, Italy, in 1900 by Cesare Isotta and the brothers Vincenzo, Antonio, and Oreste Fraschini, in 1955 it was merged with engine manufacturer Breda Motori and renamed F.A. Isotta Fraschini e Motori Breda.

History
The firm was named for its founders, Cesare Isotta and Vincenzo Fraschini, who had been importing Mors and Renault automobiles as well as Aster proprietary engines since 1899. The company they founded as Società Milanese Automobili Isotta, Fraschini & C. on 27 January 1900 had the stated purpose to "Import, sell, repair cars". Prior to establishing their own products in 1904, Isotta and Fraschini assembled cars very similar to Renaults, with Aster engines. They differed from the real Renaults in having a neater underslung front radiator arrangement.

The car, driven by Vincenzo Fraschini, appeared in several races. In 1905, Isotta Fraschini gained notoriety in the Coppa Florio, where they entered a Tipo D with a   engine. For a short time in 1907, Isotta Fraschini merged with French automobile company Lorraine-Dietrich. The firm started making race cars using this same  engine, establishing the company's reputation and giving its name considerable cachet. It was also one of the first companies to successfully market cars with four-wheel brakes, following their invention by Arrol-Johnston of Scotland in 1909. They were also among the early pioneers of overhead cam (OHC), with an engine designed by Giustino Cattaneo. Isotta Fraschini introduced their Tipo 8, the first production automobile to be powered by a straight-eight engine, at the Paris Salon in 1919 and began delivering them to customers in 1920.

With the growth of the wealthy middle class in North America in the 1920s, Isotta Fraschini marketed deluxe limousines to the new American aristocracy. Early film stars Clara Bow and Rudolph Valentino drove Isotta Fraschinis. A 1929 Tipo 8A Castagna Transformable is featured in the 1950 film Sunset Boulevard and another appears in the 1934 film Death Takes a Holiday with Fredric March. An Isotta Fraschini also makes a featured appearance in the 1946 film Without Reservations with John Wayne and Claudette Colbert. Also, an Isotta Fraschini was gigolo Lindsay Marriott's car in Raymond Chandler's book Farewell, My Lovely (1940) that was made into the motion picture Murder, My Sweet (1944), starring Dick Powell and Claire Trevor. The grille of the Isotta Fraschini with the lightning bolt insignia is seen parked in a ravine, right before Douglas Walton's character Lindsay Marriott is killed. An oversized Isotta Fraschini is also the vehicle of choice for Dick and Nicole Diver in F. Scott Fitzgerald's 1933 novel Tender is the Night.

Seriously affected by the economic crisis of the 1930s and by the disruptions of World War II, Isotta Fraschini stopped making cars after the war (1949). Only five of the last model, the Monterosa, were produced. The plants were converted to produce marine engines.

The company was left on the company register and in 1955 it was merged with engine manufacturer Breda Motori and named F.A. Isotta Fraschini e Motori Breda. The company started to produce trolley buses again and in the 1960s built a new diesel engine factory in Bari. In the 1980s, the company was renamed Isotta Fraschini Motori SpA and it became part of Fincantieri group, with administrative headquarters in the old factory in Bari.

In the 1990s, attempts to revive the automotive industry of Isotta Fraschini were made. Concept-car coupe and roadster Isotta Fraschini T8 were built in 1996, and concept-car roadster Isotta Fraschini T12 was built in 1998. The company never went into production and closed for bankruptcy in 1999.

The marque was revived in 2022, with the announcement of a new motorsport chassis designed from scratch to compete in Sports car racing, like the centenary edition of the 24 Hours of Le Mans, under Automobile Club de l'Ouest Le Mans Hypercar rules.

Aero-engines

Isotta Fraschini L.170
Isotta Fraschini L.180 I.R.C.C.15/40 inverted W-18
Isotta Fraschini L.180 I.R.C.C.45 inverted W-18
Isotta Fraschini Asso 80
Isotta Fraschini Asso 80 R.I.
Isotta Fraschini Asso 120 R.C.40
Isotta Fraschini Asso 200
Isotta Fraschini Asso 250 probably misidentification or variant of Asso 200
Isotta Fraschini Asso 500
 Isotta Fraschini Asso 500 AQ
Isotta Fraschini Asso 750 (140x170=47105cc/2875cuin)
Isotta Fraschini Asso 750 R
Isotta Fraschini Asso 750 R.C.
Isotta Fraschini Asso 750 R.C.35
Isotta Fraschini Asso IX
Isotta Fraschini Asso IX R.C.45
Isotta Fraschini Asso 1000 (150x180=57256cc/3494cuin)
Isotta Fraschini Asso Caccia
Isotta Fraschini Asso XI
Isotta Fraschini A.120 R.C.40 – (inverted version of Asso XI)
Isotta Fraschini L.121 R.C.40 – (version of Asso XI)
Isotta Fraschini Asso (racing)
Isotta Fraschini Beta
Isotta Fraschini Beta R.C.10
Isotta Fraschini Gamma
Isotta Fraschini Gamma R.C.15I
Isotta Fraschini Gamma R.C.35IS
Isotta Fraschini Delta
Isotta Fraschini Zeta
Isotta Fraschini Zeta R.C.25/60
Isotta Fraschini Zeta R.C.35
Isotta Fraschini Zeta R.C.42
Isotta Fraschini Astro 7
Isotta Fraschini Astro 7 C.21
Isotta Fraschini Astro 7 C.40
Isotta Fraschini Astro 14
Isotta Fraschini Astro 14 C.40
Isotta Fraschini Astro 14 R.C.40
Isotta Fraschini V.4
Isotta Fraschini V.5
Isotta Fraschini V.6
Isotta Fraschini 245hp
Isotta Fraschini K.14 – licence built Gnome-Rhône Mistral Major
Isotta Fraschini 80 R
Isotta Fraschini 80 T

Vehicles

Passenger cars
 Runabout 1901–1902
 Tipo FENC 1908
 Tipo KM 1910-1914
 Tipo IM 1913
 Tipo 8 1919-1924
 Tipo 8A 1924-1931
 Tipo 8B 1931-1935
 Tipo 8C Monterosa 1948-1949
 T8 1996
 T12 1998

Racing cars
 Tipo D 1905
 Tipo FE 1908
 Tipo 6 LMH-C (see below)

Trucks
 D80 1934–1955
 D65 1940–1955

Trolleybuses
 TS 40F1
 F1

Today

Active economic entities 
 Intrepida Fides, The Isotta Fraschini Foundation, acronym coined by Gabriele D'Annunzio, with registered office in Milan.
 Isotta Fraschini Milano s.r.l., with registered office in Milan, active in the field of vehicles, as well as production and marketing of luxury goods.
 Isotta Fraschini Motori S.p.A.: with registered office in Bari. An engineering firm specializing in diesel products, particularly marine engines, industrial engines, and rail traction engines, but also providing civil and military engineering products and services. The company is part of Fincantieri group. The company produces propulsion and generation systems, used in US Navy littoral fast attack surface ships and yachts. The L1306 T3, V 1312 T3, VL 1716 T2 T3 and GE COLZA V 1312 T3 generation systems produce between 200 kW and 3,000 kW. The largest of these generators are used in the Freedom class of Littoral Combat Ships.

World Endurance Championship 
A new chassis is designed from scratch to compete in sports car racing including the centenary edition of the 24 Hours of Le Mans, under ACO Hypercar rules. The car would eventually be named the Tipo 6 LMH-C.

The car has been designed by Michelotto Engineering (a long-standing Ferrari motorsport partner) with additional aerodynamic expertise from Williams Advanced Engineering.

The LMH Hypercar rules allow for several configurations. Isotta have selected hybrid all-wheel drive with the hybrid energy delivered to the front axle. The internal combustion engine is a 3-litre V6.

Isotta Fraschini is aiming for a 2023 debut of the Tipo 6 LMH-C in the FIA World Endurance Championship. To achieve this, they are partnering with the British team Vector Sport. The car was initially supposed to make its racing debut in the 6 Hours of Spa, but its alleged first race has since been pushed back to the 6 Hours of Monza due the car's production running behind schedule, meaning they will miss the 24 Hours of Le Mans.

See also

 Caproni
 Compagnia Nazionale Aeronautica
 Reggiane

References

External links

 Isotta Fraschini Motori S.p.A.
 Isotta Fraschini Milano s.r.l.
 Isotta-Fraschini history (in Russian)
 1914, multiple views
http://dieselfueltech.com/test-reports/test-report2.html

 
Milan motor companies
Aircraft engine manufacturers of Italy
Car manufacturers of Italy
Marine engine manufacturers
Engine manufacturers of Italy
Defunct motor vehicle manufacturers of Italy
Truck manufacturers of Italy
Italian automotive pioneers
Luxury brands
Luxury motor vehicle manufacturers
Sports car manufacturers
Vehicle manufacturing companies established in 1900
Italian companies established in 1900
Caproni
Fincantieri
Car brands
Vehicle manufacturing companies disestablished in 1999
1999 disestablishments in Italy